Manganese dioxide is the inorganic compound with the formula . This blackish or brown solid occurs naturally as the mineral pyrolusite, which is the main ore of manganese and a component of manganese nodules. It is used as a reagent in organic synthesis, for example, for the oxidation of allylic alcohols.  has an α-polymorph that can incorporate a variety of atoms (as well as water molecules) in the "tunnels" or "channels" between the manganese oxide octahedra.

Structure
Like many other dioxides,  crystallizes in the rutile crystal structure (this polymorph is called pyrolusite or ), with three-coordinate oxide and octahedral metal centres.   is characteristically nonstoichiometric, being deficient in oxygen. The complicated solid-state chemistry of this material is relevant to the lore of "freshly prepared"  in organic synthesis. The α-polymorph of  has a very open structure with "channels" which can accommodate metal atoms such as silver or barium.  is often called hollandite, after a closely related mineral.

Production
Naturally occurring manganese dioxide contains impurities and a considerable amount of manganese(III) oxide. Production of batteries and ferrite (two of the primary uses of manganese dioxide) requires high purity manganese dioxide. Batteries require "electrolytic manganese dioxide" while ferrites require "chemical manganese dioxide".

Chemical manganese dioxide
One method starts with natural manganese dioxide and converts it using dinitrogen tetroxide and water to a manganese(II) nitrate solution. Evaporation of the water leaves the crystalline nitrate salt. At temperatures of 400 °C, the salt decomposes, releasing  and leaving a residue of purified manganese dioxide.  These two steps can be summarized as:

  +       

In another process, manganese dioxide is carbothermically reduced to manganese(II) oxide which is dissolved in sulfuric acid. The filtered solution is treated with ammonium carbonate to precipitate . The carbonate is calcined in air to give a mixture of manganese(II) and manganese(IV) oxides. To complete the process, a suspension of this material in sulfuric acid is treated with sodium chlorate. Chloric acid, which forms in situ, converts any Mn(III) and Mn(II) oxides to the dioxide, releasing chlorine as a by-product.

Lastly, the action of potassium permanganate over manganese sulfate crystals produces the desired oxide.
2  + 3  + 2 → 5  +  + 2

Electrolytic manganese dioxide
Electrolytic manganese dioxide (EMD) is used in zinc–carbon batteries together with zinc chloride and ammonium chloride. EMD is commonly used in zinc manganese dioxide rechargeable alkaline (Zn RAM) cells also. For these applications, purity is extremely important. EMD is produced in a similar fashion as electrolytic tough pitch (ETP) copper: The manganese dioxide is dissolved in sulfuric acid (sometimes mixed with manganese sulfate) and subjected to a current between two electrodes. The MnO2 dissolves, enters solution as the sulfate, and is deposited on the anode.

Reactions

Reduction
 is the principal precursor to ferromanganese and related alloys, which are widely used in the steel industry.  The conversions involve carbothermal reduction using coke:
  +  2 C   →  Mn  +  2 CO

  +  e−  +     →  MnO(OH)

 catalyses several reactions that form .  In a classical laboratory demonstration, heating a mixture of potassium chlorate and manganese dioxide produces oxygen gas.  Manganese dioxide also catalyses the decomposition of hydrogen peroxide to oxygen and water:
2    →  2   +  

Manganese dioxide decomposes above about 530 °C to manganese(III) oxide and oxygen.  At temperatures close to 1000 °C, the mixed-valence compound  forms.  Higher temperatures give MnO, which is reduced only with difficulty.

Hot concentrated sulfuric acid reduces  to manganese(II) sulfate:
2  + 2    →   2   +    +  2 
  +  4 HCl  →     +    +  2 
As a source of hydrogen chloride, Scheele treated sodium chloride with concentrated sulfuric acid.
Eo ((s)  +  4   +  2 e−      Mn2+  +  2 ) = +1.23 V
Eo ((g) + 2 e−  2 Cl−) = +1.36 V
The standard electrode potentials for the half reactions indicate that the reaction is endothermic at pH = 0 (1 M []), but it is favoured by the lower pH as well as the evolution (and removal) of gaseous chlorine.

This reaction is also a convenient way to remove the manganese dioxide precipitate from the ground glass joints after running a reaction (for example, an oxidation with potassium permanganate).

Oxidation
2   +  4 KOH  +     →  2   +   2 
Potassium manganate is the precursor to potassium permanganate, a common oxidant.

Occurrence and applications
Approximately 500,000 tonnes are consumed for this application annually. It is also used in water treatment applications.

Prehistory 
Excavations at the Pech-de-l'Azé cave site in southwestern France have yielded blocks of manganese dioxide writing tools, which date back 50,000 years and have been attributed to Neanderthals  . Scientists have conjectured that Neanderthals used this mineral for body decoration, but there are many other readily available minerals that are more suitable for that purpose. Heyes et al. (in 2016) determined that the manganese dioxide lowers the combustion temperatures for wood from above 650 °F to 480 °F, making fire making much easier and this is likely to be the purpose of the blocks.

Organic synthesis
A specialized use of manganese dioxide is as oxidant in organic synthesis. The effectiveness of the reagent depends on the method of preparation, a problem that is typical for other heterogeneous reagents where surface area, among other variables, is a significant factor. The mineral pyrolusite makes a poor reagent. Usually, however, the reagent is generated in situ by treatment of an aqueous solution  with a Mn(II) salt, typically the sulfate.   oxidizes allylic alcohols to the corresponding aldehydes or ketones:

cis-RCH=  +    →  cis-RCH=CHCHO  +  MnO  +  

The configuration of the double bond is conserved in the reaction. The corresponding acetylenic alcohols are also suitable substrates, although the resulting propargylic aldehydes can be quite reactive.

Microbiology
In  Geobacteraceae sp., MnO2 functions as an electron acceptor coupled to the oxidation of organic compounds.  This theme has implications for bioremediation.

See also
 List of inorganic pigments

References

Cited sources

External links

 REACH Mn Consortium
 Index of Organic Synthesis procedures utilizing 
 Example Reactions with Mn(IV) oxide
 National Pollutant Inventory – Manganese and compounds Fact Sheet
 PubChem summary of 
 International Chemical Safety Card 0175
Potters Manganese Toxicity by Elke Blodgett

Manganese(IV) compounds
Oxide minerals
Inorganic pigments
Transition metal oxides
Glass dyes